Sheopur Kalan railway station is a railway station in Sheopur district, Madhya Pradesh. Its code is SOE. It serves Sheopur town. The station consists of one platform. The platform is not well sheltered. It lacks many facilities including water and sanitation.

The lies on other light railways in the former princely state of Gwalior State now part of the North Central Railway in Madhya Pradesh these 200 km of 610mm-gauge lines were originally sponsored by the Maharaja of Gwalior reaching Sheopur in 1909.  This railway line has been nominated by Indian government for the World Heritage site.

Major trains 

 Sheopur–Gwalior Passenger
 Sheopur–Sabalgarh Passenger

References 

Jhansi railway division
Railway stations in Sheopur district